Fork Lake is an unincorporated community in northern Alberta, Canada.

The community was named for a nearby, fork-shaped lake.

References 

Localities in Lac La Biche County